Paracles dukinfieldia is a moth of the subfamily Arctiinae first described by Schaus in 1896. It is found in Brazil.

References

Moths described in 1896
Paracles